Malaxis histionantha  is a species of orchid native to Latin America. It is widespread from Mexico to Argentina. It generally has two leaves and a more or less spherical cluster of small green flowers.

References

Orchids of Mexico
Orchids of South America
Orchids of Central America
Plants described in 1840
histionantha